Clanculus corallinus is a species of sea snail, a marine gastropod mollusk in the family Trochidae, the top snails.

Description
The size of the shell varies between 6 mm and 10 mm. The umbilicate shell has a globose-conic shape. It is coral-red or brown, marked beneath the sutures with narrow flames of white and maculations of brown, and on the base dotted with white. But the species exhibits a considerable variation in color. The conic spire is acute. The sutures are subcanaliculate. The five to six whorls are convex, spirally granose-lirate. The body whorl is rounded, encircled by 14 or 15 conspicuously granose equal ridges, the interstices finely obliquely striate, and with more or less obvious spiral striae. The oblique aperture is subtetragonal. The outer lip is plicate within, dentate above, the tooth usually bifid. The basal margin is curved and crenulate within. The columella is inserted deep in the rather narrow umbilicus, bearing a strong dentiform fold above and a large quadrangular biplicate tooth at the base. The parietal wall is wrinkled. The white umbilicus is smooth within and has a crenulate margin.

Distribution
This species occurs in the Mediterranean Sea.

References

 Gmelin J. F., 1791: Carli Linnaei systema Naturae per regna tria naturae. Editio decimatertia, aucta, reformata, Vermes Testacea  Leipzig [Lipsiae] 1 (6): 3021–3910
 Salis Marschlins C. U. von, 1793: Reisen in verschieden Provinzen den Königreischs Neapel ; Zurich and Leipzig, Ziegler Vol. I: pp. 442 + 10 pl
 Payraudeau B. C., 1826: Catalogue descriptif et méthodique des Annelides et des Mollusques de l'île de Corse; Paris pp. 218 + 8 pl.
 Bucquoy E., Dautzenberg P. & Dollfus G., 1882–1886: Les mollusques marins du Roussillon. Tome Ier. Gastropodes.; Paris, J.B. Baillière & fils
 Gofas, S.; Le Renard, J.; Bouchet, P. (2001). Mollusca, in: Costello, M.J. et al. (Ed.) (2001). European register of marine species: a check-list of the marine species in Europe and a bibliography of guides to their identification. Collection Patrimoines Naturels, 50: pp. 180–213

External links
 

corallinus
Gastropods described in 1791
Taxa named by Johann Friedrich Gmelin